The Devil of a Wife, or A Comical Transformation is a 1686 comedy play by the English writer and actor Thomas Jevon. It was first performed by the United Company at the Dorset Garden Theatre in London.

The original Dorset Garden cast included Philip Griffin as Sir Richard Lovemore, John Bowman as Rowland, Carey Perin as Longmore, Richard Saunders as Butler, Thomas Percival as Cook, Henry Norris as The Ladies Father, George Powell as Noddy, Thomas Jevon as  Jobson, John Freeman as Doctor, Sarah Cooke as Lady Lovemore, Emily Price as Jane, Susanna Percival as Nell.

In 1724 the play was revived at the Lincoln's Inn Fields Theatre with a cast featuring John Ogden, William Bullock and Jane Egleton. In 1731 it was adapted into a ballad opera The Devil to Pay, following the fashion for musical plays by The Beggar's Opera.

References

Bibliography
 Canfield, J. Douglas: Tricksters and Estates: On the Ideology of Restoration Comedy (Lexngton: University Press of Kentucky, 2014).
 Van Lennep, W.: The London Stage, 1660–1800: Volume One, 1660–1700 (Carbondale: Southern Illinois University Press, 1960).

1686 plays
West End plays
Restoration comedy